Elimia is a genus of freshwater snails with an operculum, aquatic gastropod mollusks in the family Pleuroceridae. Various species are found in creeks throughout much of the eastern and central United States and the Great Lakes region of Canada.  They were formerly included in the genus Goniobasis, together with the western Juga species.

Species 
Species within the genus Elimia include:

 Elimia acuta
 mud elimia (Elimia alabamensis)
 black-crest elimia (Elimia albanyensis)
 Elimia ampla (Anthony, 1854)
 Lily Shoals elimia (Elimia annettae)
 Elimia aterina
 walnut elimia (Elimia bellula)
 flaxen elimia (Elimia boykiniana)
 short-spired elimia (Elimia brevis)
 Cahaba elimia (Elimia cahawbensis)
 spindle elimia (Elimia capillaris)
 Sharp-crest Elimia (Elimia carinifera)
 closed elimia (Elimia clausa)
 lacy elimia (Elimia crenatella)
 Balcones elimia (Elimia comalensis)
 banded elimia (Elimia fascinans)
 fusiform elimia (Elimia fusiformis)
 Coldwater elimia (Elimia gerhardti)
 Elimia gibbera
 high-spired elimia (Elimia hartmaniana)
 silt elimia (Elimia haysiana)
 gladiator elimia (Elimia hydei)
 constricted elimia (Elimia impressa)
 knotty elimia (Elimia interrupta)
 slowwater elimia (Elimia interveniens)
 hearty elimia (Elimia jonesi)
 Elimia lachryma
 ribbed elimia (Elimia laeta)
 liver elimia (Elimia livescens)
 Elimia macglameriana
 round-rib elimia (Elimia nassula)
 caper elimia (Elimia olivula)
 rough-lined elimia (Elimia pilsbryi)
 Elimia porrecta
 pyramid elimia (Elimia potosiensis)
 Sprite Elimia (Elimia proxima)
 pupa elimia (Elimia pupaeformis)
 Elimia pybasi
 pygmy elimia (Elimia pygmaea)
 compact elimia (Elimia showalteri)  
 Elimia strigosa
 † Elimia tenera
 Elimia teres
 Elimia troostiana
 cobble elimia (Elimia vanuxemiana)
 puzzle elimia (Elimia varians)
 squat elimia (Elimia variata)
 piedmont elimia (Elimia virginica)

References

External links 

 
Taxonomy articles created by Polbot